

The  is a professional wrestling round-robin tag team tournament held by New Japan Pro-Wrestling as a spin-off of the popular singles tournament, the G1 Climax. It was created in 1991 as the Super Grade Tag League, as a continuation of a regular tag team tournament held since 1980, gaining the name  in 1999. In 2012, NJPW's new owners, the Bushiroad company, renamed the tournament to its current form. Since the tournament acquired its current name, the winning team earns the right to challenge for the IWGP Tag Team Championship at the following year's Wrestle Kingdom, assuming the team does not hold the title at the time of their victory.

The World Tag League is held under a points system, with 2 points for a win, 1 for a time limit draw, and 0 for a loss, no contest or double decision. The current format, introduced in 2014, is essentially identical to that of the G1 Climax, with the top-scoring team from two blocks of eight advancing to the final.



List of winners

1980
The 1980 MSG Tag League featured 9 teams in a single block and was held from November 21 to December 10, 1980.

1981
The 1981 MSG Tag League featured 10 teams in a single block and was held from November 19 to December 10, 1981. Due to a tie for second place, the two second-place teams faced each other in a semifinal to decide the finalists.

1982
The 1982 MSG Tag League featured 8 teams in a single block and was held from November 19 to December 10, 1982. "Young Simpson" may be a mistranslation; no data has been found other than being tag team partner of British wrestler Wayne Bridges.

1983
The 1983 MSG Tag League featured 9 teams in a single block and was held from November 18 to December 8, 1983.

† Hanson was injured and could not compete in the final.

1984
The 1984 MSG Tag League featured 7 teams in a single block and was held from November 16 to December 5, 1984.

1985
The 1985 IWGP Tag Title League featured 8 teams in a single block and was held from November 15 to December 12, 1985.

†Brody and Snuka no-showed the finals and jumped to All Japan Pro Wrestling

1986
The 1986 Japan Cup Tag League featured 8 teams in a single block and was held from November 14, 1986 to December 11, 1986.

1987
The 1987 Japan Cup Tag League featured 8 teams in a single block and was held from November 9, 1987 to December 7, 1987.

1991
The 1991 Super Grade Tag League featured 7 teams in a single block and was held from October 5 to October 17. Due to a tie for second place, the two second-place teams faced each other in a semifinal to decide the finalists.

1992
The 1992 Super Grade Tag League, featuring 7 teams, was held from October 8 to October 21.

1993
The 1993 Super Grade Tag League, featuring 10 teams, was held from October 8 to November 4.

1994
The 1994 Super Grade Tag League, featuring 10 teams, was held from October 19 to October 30.

1995
The 1995 Super Grade Tag League, featuring 7 teams, was held from October 15 to October 30. Due to a tie for second place, the two second-place teams faced each other in a semifinal to decide the finalists. Masa Saito also replaced Riki Choshu in his team with Kensuke Sasaki after one match.

1996
The 1996 Super Grade Tag League, featuring 8 teams, was held from October 13 to November 1. It altered the traditional points system, rewarding just 1 point for a victory, and 0 for a draw or loss.

1997
The 1997 Super Grade Tag League, featuring 8 teams, was held from November 18 to December 8. It used the same points system as the previous year, awarding 1 point for a win and 0 for a loss or draw. Due to a tie for second place, the two second-place teams faced each other in a semifinal to decide the finalists.

1998
The 1998 Super Grade Tag League, featuring 7 teams, was held from November 16 to December 6. It returned to the traditional points system, awarding 2 points for a victory, 1 for a draw, and 0 for a loss. Due to a four-way tie for first place, the four teams were paired in the semifinals, with the two winners facing off in the final. .

1999
The 1999 G1 Tag League, featuring 9 teams, was held from September 10 to September 23.

2000
The 2000 G1 Tag League, featuring 7 teams, was held from November 17 to November 30. It strayed slightly from the standard formula; as there was a four-way tie for first place, all four teams advanced to a small single-elimination tournament to decide the 2000 G1 Tag champions.

2001
The 2001 G1 Tag League, featuring 8 teams, was held from November 30 to December 11.

2003
The 2003 G1 Tag League, featuring 8 teams, was held from October 15 to October 30. The match between Mike Barton and Jim Steele and Hiroshi Tanahashi and Yutaka Yoshie did not have the usual 30-minute time limit as it was also for Tanahashi and Yoshie's IWGP World Tag Team Championship, giving it a 60-minute time limit.

2006
The 2006 G1 Tag League featured two blocks of five and ran from October 15 to November 6.

2007
The 2007 G1 Tag League was held from October 18, 2007 to November 2, 2007 over ten shows, featuring eight teams in one block. Due to a four-way tie for first place, a four-team semifinal was set up, with the matchups being randomly drawn.

1This was a handicap match, not involving Tomko due to scheduling conflicts.

2008
The 2008 G1 Tag League, featuring 12 teams in two blocks, will be held from October 18 to November 5.

2009
The 2009 G1 Tag League featured two blocks of five and ran from October 17 through November 1.

2010
The 2010 G1 Tag League featured two blocks of six and ran from October 22 through November 7.

2011
The 2011 G1 Tag League featured two blocks of six and ran from October 22 through November 6.

2012
The 2012 edition of the newly rebranded World Tag League took place from November 20 through December 2.

2013
The 2013 edition of the World Tag League took place from November 23 through December 8.

2014
The 2014 edition of the World Tag League took place from November 22 through December 7. Following his team's opening match in the tournament, Yoshitatsu was forced to pull out of the tournament with a neck injury, leading to him and Hiroshi Tanahashi forfeiting the rest of their matches.

2015
The 2015 edition of the World Tag League took place from November 21 through December 9. A.J. Styles was sidelined with a back injury following November 24, forcing him and Yujiro Takahashi to forfeit the rest of their matches.

2016
The 2016 edition of the World Tag League took place from November 18 through December 10.

2017
The 2017 edition of the World Tag League took place from November 18 through December 11. The tournament featured the NJPW debuts of Chuckie T., Jeff Cobb and Sami Callihan. The tournament featured a format change, where several top wrestlers, namely Hiroshi Tanahashi, Kazuchika Okada, Kenny Omega and Tetsuya Naito, who already had matches booked for Wrestle Kingdom 12, were left out of the tournament.

2018
The 2018 tournament saw a change to a single block and a decrease in teams. From the previous year's 16, 14 teams were competing in the 2018 league.

2019
In 2019, the World Tag League sees 16 teams competing in a single block, with the first-placed team being declared the winner. The tournament winners advanced to an IWGP Tag Team Championship match at Wrestle Kingdom 14.

2020
The 2020 World Tag League took place in tandem with the 2020 Best of the Super Juniors from November 15 to December 11. The World Tag League sees 10 teams competing in a single block, with the top two teams facing in the finals. The tournament winners advanced to an IWGP Tag Team Championship match at Wrestle Kingdom 15.

2021
The 2021 World Tag League will take place in tandem with the 2021 Best of the Super Juniors from November 13 to December 15. The World Tag League sees 12 teams competing in a single block, with the top two teams facing in the finals. The tournament winners advance to an IWGP Tag Team Championship match at Wrestle Kingdom 16.

2022
The 2022 World Tag League took place in tandem with the 2022 Super Junior Tag League from November 21 to December 14. The World Tag League sees 10 teams competing in a single block, with the top two teams facing in the finals. The tournament winners advance to an IWGP Tag Team Championship match at Wrestle Kingdom 17. On December 2, it was announced that Chase Owens would be absent for the remainder of the tournament, following the passing of a family member, leading them to forfeit the remainder of their matches.

See also
Global Tag League
World's Strongest Tag League
Ultimate Tag League
New Japan Pro-Wrestling
Professional wrestling in Japan

References

External links
World Tag League at NJPW.co.jp 
G1 Tag League at NJPW.co.jp 

New Japan Pro-Wrestling tournaments
Tag team tournaments